Christoph Perels (born 12 May 1938) is a German academic who served as director of the Freies Deutsches Hochstift literary association between 1983 and his retirement in 2003.

Life 
Christoph Perels was born in Rehfelde on 12 May 1938. He married Maie Leppik in 1966. Perels studied philology, history and philosophy at the universities of Erlangen, Kiel and Paris before receiving his  PhD from the University of Göttingen in 1974 with a thesis on the perception of Rococo poetry 1740–1760. He then began teaching at the Technical University of Braunschweig, becoming a professor in 1980.

After Detlev Lüders retired in 1982, Perels replaced him as director of the Freies Deutsches Hochstift on 1 October 1983. His time as director saw the rebuilding of the Hochstift's headquarters and the Goethe-Museum in Frankfurt. The new build included the "Arkadensaal" which is used by the Hochstift for special exhibitions, lectures and concerts. Perels also began the Hochstift's historical-critical edition of Clemens Brentano. Perels retired as director in 2003, after a twenty-year tenure. His successor was Anne Bohnenkamp-Renken. 

Perels became an Honorary Professor of Goethe University Frankfurt in 1987.

Selected works 

Goethe in seiner Epoche. Tübingen 1998
Dichterwege. Stuttgart 1999
Studien zur Aufnahme und Kritik der Rokokolyrik zwischen 1740 und 1760. Göttingen 1974 (PhD thesis)

References

Sources 

1938 births
Directors of the Freies Deutsches Hochstift
Academic staff of Goethe University Frankfurt
Living people